Hellenic Register of Shipping was founded in 1919 and is active in the industry inspections and certifications of facilities and equipment as well as the Certification of Management Systems. HRS is an international NGO -non-governmental International Organization-, dedicated to the safeguarding of both life and property at sea, the prevention of marine pollution and lastly the quality assurance in the industry.

The Hellenic Register of Shipping monitors about 5,500 passenger ships and issue the general protocol inspection, as well as several large yachts, which are covered by International Conventions (SOLAS, LL. MARPOL, etc.) or the European Directive 98/18, where the Greek classification society certify class, which is mandatory for ships heading for each one.

Specifically in the Industry operates as either an accredited and authorized organizations with public authorities as an independent or third-party organization (in cases where the conditions for works contracts).

External links
Hellenic Register of Shipping website (In Greek/English)

Ship classification societies